Tujhya Majhya Sansarala Ani Kay Hava is a Marathi Family Drama television serial which airing on Zee Marathi. It premiered on 30 August 2021 replacing Majha Hoshil Na. It is directed by Sanjay Zankar under the banner of Zankar Films.

Plot 
Siddharth Deshmukh comes from a middle class large joint family from Gulpoli, a small town near Nashik. Aditi Karmarkar comes from a distorted nuclear family whose parents are divorced. Siddharth is ambitious and can adjust with many situations but Aditi is scared of crowd and relationships which she yearned for all these years. Siddharth's grandparents hold their family members together with the rooted values whereas Aditi's parents Milind and Mahalaxmi have clashes of their egos and hence are separated. 

Siddharth works in Aditi's company and they fall in love. They confess their love and decide to get married. Siddharth is afraid Aditi's disturbing nature towards large families. Upon Aditi's insistence, they visit Gulpoli. Aditi gets ecstatic upon seeing Siddharth large family and falls unconscious when she saw the family in a collusum. Siddharth and family get her rested and brings her back to normal. He introduces Aditi as his good-friend. Deshmukh family starts for Sid's alliance. On his engagement day, Sid reveals his and Aditi's relationship to the family to which they accept. Aditi slowly starts getting acclimatized with crowded family and gets love from everyone. The Deshmukh's ask Aditi to get her parents to Gulpoli. Aditi gets scared due to the difference in the families. Milind and Mahalaxmi visit Deshmukh's and they accept their divorce. Milind and Mahalaxmi get annoyed by their large family.

Cast

Main 
 Hardeek Joshi as Siddharth Appa Deshmukh
 Amruta Pawar as Aditi Milind Karmarkar / Aditi Siddharth Deshmukh

Recurring 
Siddharth's family
 Charudatta Kulkarni as Tatya
 Surekha Lahamage-Sharma as Bayobai
 Prashant Garud as Appa
 Raja Rana replaced Prashant as Appa
 Anjali Joshi as Sumitra Appa Deshmukh (Mothyabai)
 Manjusha Joshi replaced Anjali as Mothyabai
 Hemant Deshpande as Bapu Kaka
 Chitra Kulkarni as Tai Kaki
 Shubhada Naik replaced Chitra as Tai Kaki
 Aparna Kshemkalyani as Ratna Jadhav
 Yogesh Bagul as Ratna's husband
 Niwas More as Nana Kaka
 Sanjay Gangavane replaced Niwas as Nana Kaka
 Poonam Chavan-Deshmukh as Nani Kaki
 Salman Tamboli as Bala Kaka
 Rekha Kamble-Sagwekar as Pallavi Bala Deshmukh (Pallu Kaki)
 Jyoti Raul replaced Rekha as Pallavi
 Prateek Patil as Suhas Bapu Deshmukh
 Komal Shete as Archana Suhas Deshmukh
 Meera Deshmukh as Meera Suhas Deshmukh
 Radhika Zankar as Namita Bapu Deshmukh (Nama)
 Suhani Naik as Aarya Nana Deshmukh
 Arjun Kumthekar as Dhrishtadyumna Nana Deshmukh (Dumnya)
 Ajay Tarage as Sakha

Aditi's family
 Priya Kamble-Tuljapurkar as Mahalaxmi Milind Karmarkar
 Dhananjay Wable as Milind Karmarkar
 Saurabh Kale as Raghav
 Rupali Kadam as Alvira
 Unknown as Surekha
 Laxmi Pimpale as Surekha

Others 
 Veena Jagtap as Reva Dixit
 Shubham Patil as Yuvraj; Aditi's friend
 Ganesh Jadhav as Chandrakant Bhingarde (Chandler)
 Nikhil Rahane as Amit; Siddharth's friend

Reception

Special episode

1 hour 
 31 October 2021
 21 November 2021
 9 January 2022
 6 February 2022
 13 February 2022
 20 February 2022
 6 March 2022
 17 April 2022

2 hours 
 26 December 2021 (Sid-Aditi's marriage)

Awards

References

External links 
 
 Tujhya Majhya Sansarala Ani Kay Hava at ZEE5

Marathi-language television shows
Zee Marathi original programming
2021 Indian television series debuts
2022 Indian television series endings